Henry White Edgerton (October 20, 1888 – February 23, 1970) was a United States circuit judge of the United States Court of Appeals for the District of Columbia Circuit.

Education and career

Born in Rush Center, Kansas, Edgerton received an Artium Baccalaureus degree from Cornell University in 1910, and a Bachelor of Laws from Harvard Law School in 1914. He then entered private practice as an attorney, first in Saint Paul, Minnesota in 1914, and then in Boston, Massachusetts from 1915 until 1916. Edgerton was a professor at Cornell Law School from 1916 until 1918, when he returned to private practice in Boston. In 1921, he took a teaching position at the George Washington University Law School until 1928, and then taught at Cornell University until 1937. While at Cornell, Edgerton served as Special Assistant to the United States Attorney General from 1934 until 1935, during Franklin D. Roosevelt's first term as President.

Federal judicial service

Edgerton was nominated by President Franklin D. Roosevelt on November 26, 1937, to an Associate Justice seat on the United States Court of Appeals for the District of Columbia (Judge of the United States Court of Appeals for the District of Columbia Circuit from June 25, 1948) vacated by Associate Justice Duncan Lawrence Groner. He was confirmed by the United States Senate on December 9, 1937, and received his commission on December 15, 1937. He served as Chief Judge and as a member of the Judicial Conference of the United States from 1955 to 1958. He assumed senior status on April 22, 1963. His service terminated on February 23, 1970, due to his death in Washington, D.C.

References

Sources
 

1888 births
1970 deaths
Cornell University alumni
Harvard Law School alumni
American legal scholars
Massachusetts lawyers
Minnesota lawyers
United States Department of Justice lawyers
Judges of the United States Court of Appeals for the D.C. Circuit
United States court of appeals judges appointed by Franklin D. Roosevelt
20th-century American judges
People from Rush County, Kansas